Kaieteur National Park is a national park located in the Potaro-Siparuni Region of Guyana. The Park's boundaries and purpose are defined in the Kaieteur National Park Act, and was created to preserve the natural scenery (including Kaieteur Falls), and its fauna and flora. There are organisms that are unique to this park and cannot be found anywhere else in the world. Of these organisms include the Anomaloglossus beebei, which is a frog that only inhabits the Brocchinia micrantha within this park and no where else in the world.   The Act is administered by the Kaieteur National Park Commission. 

It is usually considered the country's only national park, as the capital's National Park is a not a wilderness reserve.

The park is in the Guianan moist forests ecoregion. It is served by Kaieteur International Airport, which is at Kaieteur Falls.

Boundaries

References

External links
Official site

National parks of Guyana
Potaro-Siparuni
Protected areas of Guyana
Tourist attractions in Guyana